NWP may refer to:

 National Woman's Party, an American women's political organization
 National Writing Project, a United States professional development network
 New World Pasta, the largest retail branded pasta manufacturer in North America
 Newport railway station (station code: NWP), the third-busiest railway station in Wales
 Northwest Passage, the sea route to the Pacific Ocean through the Arctic Ocean
 Northwestern Pacific Railroad, a railroad covering the 62-mi stretch between Schellville and Windsor
 Numerical weather prediction, the use of mathematical models of the atmosphere and oceans to predict the weather